Angiotensinamide (INN; BAN and USAN angiotensin amide) is a potent vasoconstrictor used as a cardiac stimulant. It is a derivative of angiotensin II.

See also 
 Angiotensin

References 

Cardiac stimulants